Murzinia karatauensis is a species of beetle in the family Cerambycidae, and the only species in the genus Murzinia. It was described by Lazarev in 2011.

References

Lamiini
Beetles described in 2011